The fifth season of NCIS: Los Angeles an American police procedural drama television series, originally aired on CBS from September 24, 2013, to May 13, 2014. The season was produced by Shane Brennan Productions and CBS Television Studios, with Shane Brennan as showrunner and executive producer. This season aired the 100th episode of the show.

Cast and characters

Main
 Chris O'Donnell as G. Callen, NCIS Senior Special Agent (SSA) of the Office of Special Projects (O.S.P.) in Los Angeles
 Daniela Ruah as Kensi Blye, NCIS Junior Special Agent
 Eric Christian Olsen as Marty Deeks, LAPD Detective and Liaison To NCIS
 Barrett Foa as Eric Beale, NCIS Technical Operator
 Renée Felice Smith as Nell Jones, NCIS Special Agent and Intelligence Analyst
 Miguel Ferrer as Owen Granger, NCIS Assistant Director
 Linda Hunt as Henrietta Lange, NCIS Supervisory Special Agent(SSA) and Operations Manager
 LL Cool J as Sam Hanna, NCIS Senior Field Agent, second in command

Recurring
 Vyto Ruginis as Arkady Kolcheck
 Peter Cambor as Dr Nate Getz, NCIS Special Agent
 Erik Palladino as Vostanik Sabatino
 Aunjanue Ellis as Michelle Hanna, "Quinn", Sam's wife
 Timothy V. Murphy as Isaak Sidorov
 Christopher Lambert as Marcel Janvier
 Alon Abutbul as Naseem Vaziri
 Jeronimo Spinx as Thompson
 Daniel Henney as Paul Angelo
 Mercedes Mason as Talia Del Campo
 Andrew Leeds as John Booker
 Matthew Del Negro as Jack Simon
 Elizabeth Bogush as Joelle Taylor
 Ali Olomi Rafik Shahidi

Guests
 Danny Trejo as Tuhon
 Michelle Trachtenberg as Lily Lockhart
 Wesam Keesh as Eshan Navid
 Natasha Alam as Veronica Pisconov

Episodes

Production

Development
NCIS: Los Angeles was renewed for a fifth season on March 27, 2013.

Casting
On February 6, 2013, it was announced that Miguel Ferrer was promoted to series regular for the fifth season of NCIS: Los Angeles.

Writing
The Afghanistan storyline was actually not originally part of the plan for season 5, but added to keep Kensi Blye on the show despite actress Daniela Ruah's pregnancy.

Reception

Ratings

Home video release

References

General

External links
 
 

2013 American television seasons
2014 American television seasons
05